"When You're Gone" is a song by Canadian singer Shawn Mendes. It was released as a single through Island Records on March 31, 2022.

Background and promotion
Mendes debuted the song on March 19, 2022, performing it live for the first time at his South by Southwest (SXSW) performance in Austin, Texas. He teased the song by posting snippets of the song to the video-sharing app TikTok the week before its announcement and announced the song and its complete details two days later.

Composition and lyrics
"When You're Gone" is a pop-rock song that lyrically sees Mendes singing about the end of a relationship, similar to his previous single from late 2021, "It'll Be Okay". Transitioning from the first verse to the chorus, he sings: "It's hard for me to let go of you / So I'm trying to hold on, hold on / I don't wanna know what it's like when you're gone". Further, into the chorus, he croons: "I didn't know that loving you was the happiest I've ever been / So I'm just trying to hold on". The song has also been described as "a dreamy love song with a punchy chorus".

Critical reception
Before the release of "When You're Gone", Billboard Jason Lipshutz described the song as "a rollicking pop-rock track that sounds ready for radio play" and added that it "possess[es] a weight and polish that could make them staples of Mendes' set for years to come, and hint at promising new paths for his songwriting". Khushboo Malhotra of CelebMix likewise stated that "[t]he song heralds a new musical era that appears promising and elevated while widening his aural and stylistic horizons", calling it a "heartbreakingly beautiful single".

Music video
The official music video for "When You're Gone" premiered alongside the release of the song on March 31, 2022. It starts with a black-and-white resolution and sees Mendes recording the song in a studio and meeting up with fans. As the song shifts from him emotionally singing, it turns into full color when it turns into a sing-along. Three days before its release, Mendes teased the video on the video-sharing app TikTok, which saw him dancing shirtless, with the caption: "this is unusual behavior".

Credits and personnel

 Shawn Mendes – vocals, songwriting, production, guitar
 Jonah Shy – production, songwriting, vocal production, keyboards, percussion, programming
 Scott Harris – additional production, songwriting, guitar
 Jared Scharff – guitar, bass
 Adam Halferty – drums
 Andrew Maury – mixing
 Joe LaPorta – mastering
 Ashley Jacobson – recording
 Robert Johnson – recording
 Jeremy Dilli – recording

Charts

Weekly charts

Year-end charts

Certifications

Release history

References

2022 singles
2022 songs
Shawn Mendes songs
Songs written by Shawn Mendes
Canadian pop rock songs
Songs written by Scott Harris (songwriter)